Kristian Kiehling (born 17 September 1976) is a Danish-born German television, film and stage actor and filmmaker. In January 2014, Kiehling became a regular in the British soap opera EastEnders, playing Aleks Shirovs. He left the show in 2015 due to a contractual dispute. His directorial debut, Chronicle of a Summer in Europe, was premiered as the documentary centerpiece at the Lighthouse International Film Festival in 2016.

Life and career
After finishing high school in Germany, Kiehling received acting training at the Mozarteum University of Salzburg, Austria from 1997 until 2000. He took acting jobs during his studies and appeared in 1997 in his first German TV series, Alphateam – Die Lebensretter im OP.

Since 2000, he has appeared in numerous German, English and international television and film productions.
 
In 2007, he first appeared on British television as Rolf Voller in the BBC series Waking the Dead, in the two-part episode "Double Bind". Two years later, he played Nemanja Radic in All the small things. In 2011, he appeared in Will, with Damian Lewis and Bob Hoskins. In 2013, Kiehling had a role in the German TV series Verbotene Liebe. In 2014 he appeared as Aleks Shirovs in the BBC soap opera EastEnders, a role which he played until April 2015.

On stage, Kiehling performed with the Theatre Schauspielhaus Köln from 2001 until 2002, with the Studiotheater Stuttgart in 2003 and in 2004, and with The Royal Court Theatre in 2008.

Filmography

Stage appearances

References

External links

  
Kristian Kiehling at crew united
Kristian Kiehling at filmmakers (in German)

Living people
1976 births
German male stage actors
German male television actors
German male film actors
Male actors from Stuttgart